Michael Chapin is an American former child actor in film and television.

Born in Los Angeles, he began his screen career in 1944 when he appeared in The Fighting Sullivans. He continued with films such as It's a Wonderful Life and Under California Stars. Acting mostly in western pictures, he retired from show business in 1959.

Michael Chapin is the older brother of Billy Chapin and Lauren Chapin.

Filmography

References

Further reading 

 Holmstrom, John (1996). The Moving Picture Boy: An International Encyclopaedia from 1895 to 1995. Norwich: Michael Russell, p. 198.

External links

 

Living people
American male child actors
Male actors from California
20th-century American male actors
Year of birth missing (living people)